Valle F.C. is a Honduran football club based in Nacaome, Honduras.

They play their home games at the Estadio José Elias Nazar.

History
They were promoted from Honduran Liga Mayor to Honduran Liga Nacional de Ascenso in summer 2013 after defeating Juventus (from Guaimaca) on a 3–1 aggregated score.  In April 2018, they lost to Brasilia F.C. and were relegated back to Liga Mayor.

References

Football clubs in Honduras